The 1995 Total Petroleum 200 took place on July 15 at Colorado National Speedway in Dacono, Colorado.

This event was 200 laps long and it was the eleventh race (first season) of the series where it held the closest margin of victory in the history of the NASCAR SuperTruck Series. As Butch Miller and Mike Skinner were side by side on the last lap of the race, as Miller won the race by 0.001 of a second, it was Miller's only victory. 

The closest margin of victory since then was in the 2010 Mountain Dew 250 at Talladega Superspeedway, as Kyle Busch beat Aric Almirola by 0.002 of a second. It was the closest margin of victory among NASCAR's three national series until February 17, 2018 when Tyler Reddick beat Elliott Sadler by 0.0004 of a second in the Xfinity Series race at Daytona.

Results
 98-Butch Miller
 3-Mike Skinner
 16-Ron Hornaday Jr. (pole sitter)
 75-Bill Sedgwick
 7-Dave Rezendes
 84-Joe Ruttman
 6-Rick Carelli
 31-Jack Sprague
 83-Steve Portenga
 20-Walker Evans
 1-P. J. Jones
 30-Dennis Setzer
 21-Tobey Butler
 24-Scott Lagasse
 87-John Nemechek
 11-Mike Hurlbert
 79-Jimmy Dick
 81-Jerry Glanville
 10-Dennis Wooldridge
 64-Kenny Allen
 23-T. J. Clark
 37-Bob Strait
 51-Kerry Teague
 4-Bob Brevak
 34-Raymond Daniels
 38-Sammy Swindell
 08-Mike Bliss
 14-John Kinder

Notes
Time of race: 1 hour 20 minutes and 14 seconds
Average speed: 56.086 mph
Pole speed: 78.566 mph set by Ron Hornaday Jr.
Cautions: 9 for 43 laps
Margin of victory: .001 sec (closest in Truck Series history)

Quotes
"Too close to call"-Ken Squier instated about the finish during the CBS Sports coverage of the race.

References

External links
Racing-Reference Race Results

Total Petroleum 200
Total Petroleum 200
NASCAR races at Colorado National Speedway